Pleurotus purpureo-olivaceus is a gilled fungus native to Australia and New Zealand.  It is found on dead wood of Nothofagus trees.  Although morphologically similar to some other Pleurotus fungi, it has been shown to be a distinct species incapable of cross-breeding and phylogenetically removed from other species of Pleurotus.

Stipes are lateral and white to yellow.

See also
List of Pleurotus species

References

External links
 
 Biological Species in Pleurotus: ISG XV: Pleurotus purpureo-olivaceus at University of Tennessee-Knoxville Mycology Lab

Pleurotaceae
Fungi described in 1964
Fungi native to Australia
Fungi of New Zealand
Carnivorous fungi
Edible fungi